Harpo may refer to:

Harpo Marx, American comedian, mime artist, and musician best known as a member of the Marx Brothers
Harpo Productions, American multimedia company founded by Oprah Winfrey ("Harpo" is "Oprah" spelled backwards)
Harpo (singer), stage name of Jan Svensson, Swedish pop singer
Slim Harpo, stage name of James Moore, American blues musician